Jean-Pierre Rensburg (born 24 September 1929) was a Belgian field hockey player. He competed in the men's tournament at the 1956 Summer Olympics.

References

External links
 

1929 births
Possibly living people
Belgian male field hockey players
Olympic field hockey players of Belgium
Field hockey players at the 1956 Summer Olympics
People from Saint-Gilles, Belgium
Field hockey players from Brussels